Term Brady is an EP by American rapper Termanology. The EP was released on October 9, 2015. The EP features guest appearances from Slaine, Cyrus Deshield, Kay-R, Ransom, Wais P, Maino, Reverie, Glasses Malone, Reks, Papoose, Hannibal Stax, Justin Tyme, Ruste Juxx, Lil' Fame, and the late Sean Price.

Track listing

References

2015 EPs
Termanology albums
Hip hop albums by American artists
Albums produced by Statik Selektah
Albums produced by 9th Wonder
Albums produced by DJ Premier